Ling Daoyang (1888–1993) was a Chinese educator, forester and agronomist. 

Born on 18 December 1888 in what is now Buji Subdistrict, and then located within Xin'an County, Ling earned bachelor's of science in agriculture at the Massachusetts Agricultural College, followed by a master's degree in forestry at Yale University in the United States. In 1915, he proposed to the Beiyang government that it commemorate Arbor Day. The Nationalist government moved the date of Arbor Day in 1929, but continued to observe it in China until 1949. Ling was the principal of Chung Chi College from 1955 to 1960, and principal of United College from 1960 to 1963. He was also one of the founders of the Chinese University of Hong Kong. Ling moved to the United States in 1980, and died at the age of 105 on 2 August 1993.

References 

1888 births
1993 deaths
Men centenarians
Hong Kong centenarians
Hong Kong educators
Foresters
20th-century Chinese scientists
Academic staff of the Chinese University of Hong Kong
Chinese agronomists
Chinese expatriates in the United States
Scientists from Guangdong
Hong Kong people of Hakka descent
People from Shenzhen
Yale School of Forestry & Environmental Studies alumni
Massachusetts Agricultural College alumni